Municipal Corporation of The City of Panvel is the governing body of the city of Panvel in Raigad district. Municipal Corporation mechanism in India was introduced during British Rule with formation of municipal corporation in Madras (Chennai) in 1688, later followed by municipal corporations in Bombay (Mumbai) and Calcutta (Kolkata) by 1762. Sitamarhi Municipal Corporation is headed by Mayor of city and governed by Commissioner. Panvel  Municipal Corporation has been formed with functions to improve the infrastructure of town.

In 2016 Maharashtra State cabinet decided to elevate Panvel Municipal Council to Municipal Corporation.

List of Mayor

List of Deputy Mayor

List of Chairman, Standing Committee

History 
Panvel Municipal Council was formed on August 25, 1852 as the first municipal council in the country. The First President of Panvel Municipality is Mr.Yusuf Noor Muhammad Master, The initial notification for converting Panvel Municipal Council to Municipal Corporation came in the year 1991 but was never finalised. After rapid urbanisation post-2000, Panvel Municipal Council was eventually upgraded to Municipal Corporation in 2016.

Panvel Municipal Corporation is the first Municipal Corporation in Raigad district, 9th in the Mumbai Metropolitan Region and 27th in the state of Maharashtra. The Municipal Corporation includes 29 revenue villages of Panvel taluka including  CIDCO colonies of Taloja, Kharghar, Kalamboli, Kamothe, New Panvel  covering area of 110 km2.

The Government of Maharashtra through its Urban Development Department's notification dated 14 October 2016 has added 11 more villages (namely: Bid, Adivali, Rohinjan, Dhansar, Pisarve, Turbhe, Karvale Budruk, Nagzeri, Taloje Majkur, Ghot and Koynavele) of Panvel Taluka to the Panvel Municipal Corporation. Earlier these 11 villages were part of MMRDA's sanctioned development plan of "AKBSNA"(Ambernath Kulgaon Badlapur Surrounding Notified Area).

Revenue sources 

The following are the Income sources for the Corporation from the Central and State Government.

Revenue from taxes  
Following is the Tax related revenue for the corporation.

 Property tax.
 Profession tax.
 Entertainment tax.
 Grants from Central and State Government like Goods and Services Tax.
 Advertisement tax.

Revenue from non-tax sources 

Following is the Non Tax related revenue for the corporation.

 Water usage charges.
 Fees from Documentation services.
 Rent received from municipal property.
 Funds from municipal bonds.

Corporation election 2017

Political performance in election 2017 
Panvel Municipal Corporation elections were conducted on 24 May 2017.

Administration 
The Municipal Corporation is headed by Mr. Sudhakar Deshmukh (previously Dr. Ganesh Deshmukh), who holds the post of Municipal Commissioner-cum-Administrator in the absence of an elected legislature. After the first elections will be held in summer 2017, the municipal corporation will consist of democratically elected members, headed by a mayor and administer the city's infrastructure, public services and supplies.

See also 
 Panvel
 Navi Mumbai
 Raigad district

References 

Municipal corporations in Maharashtra
2016 establishments in Maharashtra
Panvel